General elections were held in Ecuador in 1978 and 1979. The first round of the presidential election was held on 16 July 1978, with a second round held alongside parliamentary elections on 29 April 1979. The presidential election was won by Jaime Roldós Aguilera of the Concentration of People's Forces (CPF), who received 68.5% of the vote in the run-off, becoming the country's first freely-elected president. The CPF emerged as the largest party in the National Congress, winning 29 of the 69 seats.

Results

President

National Congress

List of elected representatives

References

Ecuador
Ecuador
Elections in Ecuador
1979 in Ecuador
1978 in Ecuador